A.B.R. High School is a secondary school situated in Alimabad, Muladi, Barisal, Bangladesh.

Schools in Barisal District